The 1998 AC Delco 400 was the 32nd stock car race of the 1998 NASCAR Winston Cup Series and the 24th iteration of the event. The race was held on Sunday, November 1, 1998, in Rockingham, North Carolina, at North Carolina Speedway, a  permanent high-banked racetrack. The race took the scheduled 393 laps to complete. In the final laps of the race, Hendrick Motorsports driver Jeff Gordon would manage to make a late race pass on Penske-Kranefuss Racing driver Rusty Wallace to take his 41st career NASCAR Winston Cup Series victory and his 12th victory of the season. 

In the process, Jeff Gordon would manage to clinch his third career NASCAR Winston Cup Series championship, completing a dominant and historic run.

Background 

North Carolina Speedway was opened as a flat, one-mile oval on October 31, 1965. In 1969, the track was extensively reconfigured to a high-banked, D-shaped oval just over one mile in length. In 1997, North Carolina Motor Speedway merged with Penske Motorsports, and was renamed North Carolina Speedway. Shortly thereafter, the infield was reconfigured, and competition on the infield road course, mostly by the SCCA, was discontinued. Currently, the track is home to the Fast Track High Performance Driving School.

Entry list 

 (R) denotes rookie driver.

Practice

First practice 
The first practice session was held on Friday, October 30, at 10:00 AM EST. The session would last for one hour and 25 minutes.

Final practice 
The final practice session, sometimes referred to as Happy Hour, was held on Saturday, October 31, after the preliminary 1998 AC Delco 200 NASCAR Busch Series race. The session would last for one hour.

Qualifying 
Qualifying was split into two rounds. The first round was held on Friday, October 30, at 2:00 PM EST. Each driver would have one lap to set a time. During the first round, the top 25 drivers in the round would be guaranteed a starting spot in the race. If a driver was not able to guarantee a spot in the first round, they had the option to scrub their time from the first round and try and run a faster lap time in a second round qualifying run, held on Saturday, October 31, at 9:30 AM EST. As with the first round, each driver would have one lap to set a time. On January 24, 1998, NASCAR would announce that the amount of provisionals given would be increased from last season. Positions 26-36 would be decided on time, while positions 37-43 would be based on provisionals. Six spots are awarded by the use of provisionals based on owner's points. The seventh is awarded to a past champion who has not otherwise qualified for the race. If no past champion needs the provisional, the next team in the owner points will be awarded a provisional.

Three drivers would fail to qualify: Steve Grissom, Andy Hillenburg, and Dave Marcis.

Full qualifying results 

*Time not available.

Race results

References 

1998 NASCAR Winston Cup Series
NASCAR races at Rockingham Speedway
November 1998 sports events in the United States
1998 in sports in North Carolina